Astrid Linthorst is a professor of neuroscience at the School of Clinical Sciences at the University of Bristol, UK. Specializing in the neurochemistry and neuroendocrinology of stress and behavior, she heads a research group on the mechanisms that support coping with stress in the brain. She is also chair of the Scientific Programme Committee of the ECNP Congress and a member of the European College of Neuropsychopharmacology (ECNP) Executive Committee.

Career

Education
Linthorst received her PhD in Pharmacology at the Rudolf Magnus Institute of Neuroscience at the University of Utrecht, the Netherlands. After completing her PhD, she was a scientist and research group head at the Max Planck Institute in Munich. She is currently a professor of neuroscience at the University of Bristol. Prior to this appointment, she served as a senior lecturer and reader in neuroscience within the department. She is also the director of the MSc program in molecular neuroscience and co-director of the MRes program in systems neuroscience.

Research focus/interests
Linthorst heads a research group that studies stress, specifically the neurochemical and neuroendocrine mechanisms that support coping with stress. The group also studies the effects of exercise on stress relief. The research group is funded by the Wellcome Trust and the European Union.

Awards
Linthorst has been awarded two grants from the Wellcome Trust, a biomedical research charity based in London. She also received a grant from the Biotechnology and Biological Sciences Research Council (BBSRC).

Positions of trust and research assessments
Linthorst is a member of the Society for Neuroscience, the British Neuroscience Association, the British Society for Neuroendocrinology, the British Association for Psychopharmacology, and the European College of Neuropsychopharmacology (ECNP), where she chairs the Scientific Programme Committee of the ECNP Congress.

Publications
Linthorst has published extensively.
Key publications include:

References

External links 
“European College of Neuropsychopharmacology (ECNP)”
“Bristol University” 
“Wellcome Trust”
 “Biotechnology and Biological Sciences Research Council” 

Living people
Year of birth missing (living people)
Dutch neuroscientists
Dutch women neuroscientists
Academics of the University of Bristol
Utrecht University alumni